Christopher Beau Landon (born February 27, 1975) is an American film director, producer, and screenwriter best known for working in the horror and comedy horror genres.

He has worked as a screenwriter on the thriller Disturbia and most of the films in the Paranormal Activity found-footage horror series. He wrote and directed Paranormal Activity: The Marked Ones as well as the horror comedy films Happy Death Day, Scouts Guide to the Zombie Apocalypse, Happy Death Day 2U, Freaky, and We Have a Ghost. He wrote and made his directorial debut on the satirical thriller film Burning Palms (2010).

Early life
Landon was born in Los Angeles and is the son of actor Michael Landon and Lynn Noe. He is the youngest of four children produced by their marriage. His parents divorced in 1980, when he was four years old; he resided with his father until the age of sixteen, when his father died of pancreatic cancer. One of his brothers is Michael Landon Jr., an actor, and one of his half-sisters is Jennifer Landon, an actress. His paternal grandfather was Jewish, whereas his paternal grandmother was Catholic, although his father was raised Jewish.

Career
Landon, following his father Michael Landon's footsteps in filmmaking, studied screenwriting at Loyola Marymount University, but dropped out three years into the course to pursue a career when film director Larry Clark offered him a writing job after reading one of his scripts. He went on to co-write the script of Another Day in Paradise with Eddie Little and Stephen Chin. After writing Another Day in Paradise, he came out as gay, aware that homophobia may have harmed his potential in the industry. "I may fall off some list because of my sexuality. But if that happens, then I really don't want to be on that list anyway," he said, speaking of homophobia in Hollywood and the film industry. "I was the flavor of the month, and then I was quickly dismissed. I reached a point in my career when I couldn't get a meeting anywhere." He moved from Los Angeles to Austin, Texas, contemplating the future of his career, which he revived only a few years later.

Most of Landon's films deal with gay themes and issues, including $30, one of five components in Boys Life 3, a collection of short films dealing with issues faced by gays, and a spec script about the relationship between a straight man and a gay man. More recently, he has written the screenplays of the 2007 films Blood and Chocolate, The Flock and the acclaimed Disturbia. Disturbia was one of his spec scripts which was brought to Montecito Pictures and subsequently DreamWorks Pictures, and went on to become No. 1 in cinemas upon its release. He next worked on The Lesson, a film for DreamWorks and the 2007 television series Dirty Sexy Money, his first television project, eager to expand his repertoire. He is worked on a screenplay for a film adaption of Lisa McMann's young adult novel Wake. Landon made his directorial debut with Burning Palms, a comedic thriller that was poorly received.

Landon became a creative voice behind the Paranormal Activity film series, writing Paranormal Activity 2, Paranormal Activity 3, Paranormal Activity 4, and Paranormal Activity: Next of Kin. Landon also directed and wrote the franchise spinoff, Paranormal Activity: The Marked Ones, which was released in 2014. 

Landon's next film was Scouts Guide to the Zombie Apocalypse. He then wrote and directed Happy Death Day and Happy Death Day 2U.

Personal life
Landon came out as gay in 1999, having only written the script of Another Day in Paradise, unafraid of his sexuality harming his career potential. He says that growing up he was called a "faggot" by peers at his high school. His mother, a Christian, initially refused to accept his sexuality, but he told her, "I don't even know if I believe in God, but if I do, he gave you a gay son so that you can start confronting some of these issues and get yourself out of the box you've placed yourself in for so long." His stepmother, Cindy Clerico, his father's next wife, told him that both she and his father suspected he was gay.

Filmography

References

External links

1975 births
Film producers from California
American people of Jewish descent
American male screenwriters
American soap opera writers
Film directors from Los Angeles
American gay writers
Horror film directors
LGBT film directors
American LGBT screenwriters
LGBT people from California
Living people
Writers from Los Angeles
American male television writers
Screenwriters from California
Michael Landon family
21st-century LGBT people